Zhou Shidi (Chinese: 周士第; Pinyin: Zhōu Shìdì; 1900–1979) was a general of the People's Liberation Army of China.

Early life

Zhou was born in Lehui County, Guangdong Province (known as Qionghai, Hainan since the creation of that province in 1988).

He was a first-term graduate from Whampoa Military Academy in 1924, and he joined the Communist Party of China in the same year.

Career

Early in the Second Sino-Japanese War, he was made chief of staff of 120 divisions of the Eighth Route Army. During the Chinese Civil War, he was the commander of the 18th Army Group.

After the war, Zhou held several political offices. He was a member of the 1st, 2nd, and 3rd Commissions of National Defense, a member of standing committee of the 3rd and 4th People's Political Consultative Conference, a deputy of the 1st and 4th National People's Congress, a member of standing committee of the 5th National People's Congress, and a delegate of the 7th and 8th National Congress of CPC.

He received the rank of General in 1955.

Death

Zhou died on June 30, 1979 in Beijing.

Zhou Shidi
1900 births
1979 deaths
People's Republic of China politicians from Hainan
Delegates to the 1st National People's Congress
Delegates to the 4th National People's Congress
Members of the Standing Committee of the 5th National People's Congress
Members of the Standing Committee of the 3rd Chinese People's Political Consultative Conference
Members of the Standing Committee of the 4th Chinese People's Political Consultative Conference
Chinese Communist Party politicians from Hainan
People from Qionghai